Major-General Alastair Andrew Bernard Reibey Bruce  (born 25 June 1960) is a  journalist and television correspondent, and a senior British Army reservist and officer of arms of the Royal Household. He commanded the TA Media Operations Group before being appointed Governor of Edinburgh Castle in 2019.

Royal, Religious and National Events Commentator for Sky News, Bruce was previously engaged by the BBC, and was historical adviser to several feature films and the ITV series Downton Abbey. He has commentated on many major state events in the United Kingdom, including the Queen's Diamond Jubilee in 2012, the Royal Wedding in 2011, the Papal Visit in 2010, and the deaths and funerals of Diana, Princess of Wales in 1997, The Queen Mother in 2002, The Duke of Edinburgh in 2021, and Queen Elizabeth II in 2022.

Early life and education
Bruce was born in Winchester in 1960, younger son of Lieutenant-Commander Henry Victor Bruce of Salloch and Helen Vernon Wallop William-Powlett, daughter of Vice Admiral Sir Peveril William-Powlett. His great-grandfather was James Bruce, 8th Earl of Elgin and 12th Earl of Kincardine, and he is in the line of succession to both family earldoms. Brought up in Hampshire, he spent much of his childhood in Sutherland, in the far north of the Scottish Highlands, where his parents owned the Sallachy Estate near the village of Lairg.

Bruce was educated at Milton Abbey School, an independent boarding school for boys (now co-educational), in Milton Abbas, Dorset, before attending the Royal Military Academy Sandhurst, in Berkshire.

Life and career

Armed forces 
Commissioned in the British Army, 1979, Bruce was promoted, the following year, as Lieutenant in the 2nd Battalion of the Scots Guards. He served as a regular officer for four years, seeing active service in the Falklands War of 1982. The following year, he erected a cairn at Sallachy in Sutherland, in memory of his orderly during the War, Guardsman James Reynolds, from the village of Bridge of Weir in Renfrewshire, who was killed in action while bringing back a wounded comrade, who survived. Reynolds died at the age of 19 at Tumbledown Mountain, and at the time was the only soldier to be awarded the Distinguished Conduct Medal posthumously. At the time, Alastair Bruce said: "On returning to Britain after the Falklands, I decided I wanted to do something in honour of Jim Reynolds. He was such a brave young man who was well liked by everyone".

An Assistant Vice-President with Merrill Lynch from 1983 to 1989, Bruce remained a reservist.  In 2004, he took command of the reserve unit, Media Operations Group, co-ordinating media representation of military activity. In the same year, he was mobilised on active operations in Iraq, serving in Operation TELIC. He was promoted Colonel in the Territorial Army, and became the Equerry to Prince Edward. In 2008, Bruce was appointed a Knight of St John (OStJ (1991); CStJ (1997)), and in 2010, became OBE in the Queen's Birthday Honours for "services to the Territorial Army". He was Deputy Commander of 3rd Division and Colonel of the London Scottish Regiment.  

In 2019, Bruce succeeded Major General Michael Riddell-Webster as Governor of Edinburgh Castle and was promoted to the rank of Major General.

In 2020, Bruce was appointed Honorary Colonel of 5 Military Intelligence Battalion; and in 2021, as Honorary Colonel of Tayforth Universities Officers' Training Corps.

Officer of Arms 

The Queen appointed him as one of her heralds on 7 October 1998 as Fitzalan Pursuivant, and he has been a member of the Royal Company of Archers, the Queen's ceremonial bodyguard in Scotland, since 1990.

Television, film and publications

Historian
Bruce has worked as a historical advisor to Oscar-winning films such as The King's Speech (2010) and The Young Victoria (2009), and the BAFTA-winning television series Downton Abbey (2010–2015) in which he provided historical accuracy as far as possible while balancing this with the need not to slow down the story unduly. He also advised on the minutiae of early 20th-century society protocol, in such subjects as dress, posture, the serving of food and even on matters that might initially appear trivial, such as the use of vocabulary or the correct way to step out of a car.

Bruce has written many books, and worked with several independent production companies in the preparation of television documentaries which are regularly aired on the BBC, America's PBS network, Discovery Channel and A&E channels. Among these are Nicholas and Alexandra, Victoria and Albert (2001) and Days of Majesty.

Royal documentary
In 2017 Bruce recorded a conversation with Queen Elizabeth II for the BBC: the Queen spoke about her coronation, more than 60 years earlier, in a programme entitled The Coronation.

Academia
Bruce has lectured widely throughout Britain, Europe and the United States; his subjects range from the last Tsars of Russia to Britain's monarchy and the Vatican. In 2011, he was appointed Honorary Professor of Media at the University of Winchester.

Personal life
In 1984, Bruce was recognised in the name of Bruce of Crionaich by Lord Lyon King of Arms.

On 3 July 2021, after 20 years together, Bruce was married to Stephen Knott at St John's Episcopal Church by the Bishop of Edinburgh. 

Bruce is a godfather to the Earl of Wessex, the son of the Duke and Duchess of Edinburgh.

Arms

Honours

As an Equerry to HRH The Earl of Wessex since 2008, he wears an aiguillette on his right shoulder while in military uniform, as well the Royal Cypher of The Earl of Wessex on his epaulettes. He was appointed a Deputy Lieutenant for Greater London on 9 October 2012. This granted him the use of the post nominal letters "DL" in perpetuity.

See also
 Governor of Edinburgh Castle

Publications
 Days of Majesty, (co-authored with Simon Welfare); Macmillan Publications, London (1993) 
 Keepers of the Kingdom: The Ancient Offices of Britain (co-authored with Mark Cator and Julian Calder); Cassell Illustrated Publications, London (1999)
 The Oldest: In Celebration of Britain's Living History (co-authored with Julian Calder); Cassell Publications, London (2005)
 The Butler's Guide to Running the Home and Other Graces (foreword by Alastair Bruce and written by Stanley Ager and Fiona St. Aubyn); Biteback Publications, London (2012)

References

External links
 Journalisted – Alastair Bruce
 
 Burke's Peerage & Baronetage, ELGIN, E

1960 births
Living people
Military personnel from Winchester
London Scottish officers
Clan Bruce
People educated at Milton Abbey School
Graduates of the Royal Military Academy Sandhurst
Scots Guards officers
English people of Scottish descent
British people of Scottish descent
Sky News newsreaders and journalists
British reporters and correspondents
British television presenters
Knights of Justice of the Order of St John
British Army major generals
Members of the British Royal Household
British Army personnel of the Falklands War
British Army personnel of the Iraq War
Members of the Royal Company of Archers
Officers of the Order of the British Empire
Deputy Lieutenants of Greater London
Equerries
LGBT military personnel
British LGBT journalists
Recipients of military awards and decorations